The 2015 ICC Africa Twenty20 Championship was a cricket tournament held in Benoni, South Africa, from 27–31 March 2015. All matches were played at the Willowmoore Park complex.

Namibia won the tournament (its first) on net run rate from Kenya, with both teams progressing to the 2015 World Twenty20 Qualifier in Ireland and Scotland. Two other African sides, South Africa and Zimbabwe, are ICC full members, and thus qualify directly for the World Twenty20. Namibian Gerrie Snyman and Kenyan James Ngoche led the tournament in runs and wickets, respectively, and Ngoche was Player of the Tournament.

The 2015 event was the third edition of the ICC Africa Twenty20 Championship's Division One, instituted prior to the 2012 World Twenty20 Qualifier. It was held in South Africa for the first time, with the two previous editions held in Uganda. Six teams participated, each playing each other once in a round-robin. Five of the teams were associate members of the ICC, with Ghana the only affiliate member at the tournament.

Points table 

Won – 2 points

Lost – 0 points

Tie or No Result – 1 point

Fixtures

Statistics

Most runs
The top five runscorers are included in this table, ranked by runs scored and then by batting average.

Source: CricHQ

Most wickets

The top five wicket takers are listed in this table, ranked by wickets taken and then by bowling average.

Source: CricHQ

Final standing

WCL Division Six qualifier

Along with the Twenty20 tournament, two teams, Botswana and Ghana, played each other in a one-off 50-overs match for a qualification spot in the 2015 ICC World Cricket League Division Six tournament, at present the lowest WCL division.

References 

Africa Division One
International cricket competitions in 2014–15
ICC Africa Twenty20 Division One
International cricket competitions in South Africa